Michel J. Babin (born December 1, 1954 in Kapuskasing, Ontario) is a Canadian retired ice hockey player.

Babin spent his junior years in the Manitoba Junior Hockey League for the Kenora Muskies and in the Northern Ontario Junior Hockey Association for the North Bay Trappers.  He was drafted 180th overall by the St. Louis Blues in the 1974 NHL amateur draft and 218th overall by the Indianapolis Racers in the 1974 WHA Amateur Draft.  Babin chose to report to the Blues and was sent to the Denver Spurs of the Central Hockey League for development.  He eventually played eight games for St. Louis during the 1975-76 NHL season but did not manage to score a point and spent the remainder of the season in the American Hockey League for the Providence Reds.  He returned to the CHL for spells with the Kansas City Blues and the Salt Lake Golden Eagles before finishing his career in Austria for VEU Feldkirch.

External links

1954 births
Living people
Canadian ice hockey centres
Denver Spurs players
Ice hockey people from Ontario
Indianapolis Racers draft picks
Kansas City Blues players
Kenora Muskies players
People from Kapuskasing
Providence Reds players
St. Louis Blues draft picks
St. Louis Blues players
Salt Lake Golden Eagles (CHL) players
VEU Feldkirch players
Canadian expatriate ice hockey players in Austria
Canadian expatriate ice hockey players in the United States